Lynde Creek is a stream in the municipalities of Whitby and Scugog, Regional Municipality of Durham, in the Greater Toronto Area of Ontario, Canada. It is in the Great Lakes Basin, is a tributary of Lake Ontario, and is under the auspices of the Central Lake Ontario Conservation Authority. The creek begins on the Oak Ridges Moraine in geographic Reach Township in the municipality of Scugog, and flows south to its mouth in the southwest of the town of Whitby. Portions of the  watershed also extend into the town of Ajax, the city of Pickering and the municipality of Uxbridge.

References

Tributaries of Lake Ontario
Rivers of the Regional Municipality of Durham